Humanities and Social Sciences Communications is a peer-reviewed open access academic journal published by Nature Portfolio. It covers all areas of the social sciences and humanities. It was established in 2014 as Palgrave Communications, obtaining its current name in 2020.

Abstracting and indexing
The journal is abstracted and indexed in:
Arts and Humanities Citation Index
Current Contents/Arts & Humanities
Current Contents/Social and Behavioral Sciences
Index Islamicus
Scopus
Social Sciences Citation Index
According to the Journal Citation Reports, the journal has a 2021 impact factor of 2.731.

References

External links

Multidisciplinary academic journals
Continuous journals
English-language journals
Publications established in 2015
Nature Research academic journals